Maniruzzaman, also known as Mohāmmada Manirujjāmāna (born 15 February 1940) is a retired Professor of Linguistics at the University of Chittagong, Bangladesh. His publications include 18 authored books and eight edited books; his writings include poetry, song lyrics, literary criticism and studies of folklore, as well as linguistics. He was awarded the 2015 Bangla Academy Literary Award in the Research category and the 2023 Ekushey Padak in the language and literature category.

Early life and education
Maniruzzaman was born in West Bengal and took his early schooling in Naihati and Kolkata. In 1947 before the Partition of India, his family returned to his father's ancestral village of Adiabad, in Raipura Upazila, now in Narsingdi District, Bangladesh, where he matriculated from Adiabad Islamia High School in 1953 and was admitted to  St. Gregory College (later called Notre Dame College, Dhaka). Financial hardship due to the death of his father forced him to withdraw from the college in 1957. He obtained a BA with Honours in Bengali in 1960 from University of Dhaka, and an MA in 1961. His PhD work was conducted under a scholarship at the Central Institute of Indian Languages, Mysore, supervised by Debi Prasanna Pattanayak, and the title of his thesis (1977) is Controlled historical reconstruction based on five Bengali dialects.

Career

Maniruzzaman worked as a teacher in a number of degree colleges between 1961 and 1968, before joining the Bengali Department of Chittagong University in 1968, where he continued teaching until 2008, except for a break to complete his PhD, and to work as a visiting lecturer at the All India Institute of Speech and Hearing in Mysore (1975–1977).

Maniruzzaman has also served as Dean of the Faculty of Arts, University of Chittagong (1994–1996), and as Executive Director of the Nazrul Institute, Dhaka (1991–1993).

Since retirement he worked as a part-time teacher at Dhaka University (2008–2009).

Works
 Mohammad Ali, Mohammad Moniruzzaman, Jahangir Tareque (eds) 1994. Bangla Academy Bengali-English dictionary. The Academy, Dhaka.

References

1940 births
Living people
Recipients of Bangla Academy Award
Academic staff of the University of Chittagong
Linguists from Bangladesh
Bengali male poets
University of Dhaka alumni
University of Mysore alumni